The dry gallon, also known as the corn gallon or grain gallon, is a historic British dry measure of volume that was used to measure grain and other dry commodities and whose earliest recorded official definition, in 1303, was the volume of  of wheat. It is not used in the US customary system – though it implicitly exists since the US dry measures of bushel, peck, quart, and pint are still used – and is not included in the National Institute of Standards and Technology handbook that many US states recognize as the authority on measurement law.

The US fluid gallon is about 14.1% smaller than the dry gallon, while the Imperial fluid gallon is about 3.2% larger.

Since the bushel was later defined to be exactly 2150.42 cubic inches, this figure became the exact value for the dry gallon ( gives exactly ).

References

Units of volume